The 2022 Campeonato Mineiro (officially Campeonato Mineiro SICOOB 2022 – Módulo I for sponsorship reasons) was the 108th edition of the state championship of Minas Gerais organized by the FMF. The competition started on 26 January and ended on 3 April 2022.

Atlético Mineiro successfully defended its bi-championship and earned the 47th title.

Format

First stage
The 2022 Módulo I first stage was contested by 12 clubs in a single round-robin tournament. The four best-placed teams qualified for the final stage and the bottom two teams will be relegated to the 2023 Módulo II.

The three best-placed teams not already qualified for the 2023 seasons of the Série A, Série B or Série C, gained berths in the Série D. The four best-placed teams qualified for the 2023 Copa do Brasil. If a team qualified for the Copa do Brasil by other means, its berth would be awarded to the Troféu Inconfidência champions.

Knockout stage
The knockout phase will be played between the 4 best placed teams from the previous phase in a two-legged tie in the semi-finals, where the team with the best seed will win the right to choose the order of the legs. The final, from this edition onwards, will take place in a single match on neutral ground. The away goals rule will not be used, and if two teams tied for higher aggregate goals, the highest ranked team would advance.

Troféu Inconfidência
The Inconfidência Trophy will be disputed between the teams from 5th to 8th placed in the previous phase. The semi-finals will be two-handed tie and the final will be played in a single game.

Participating teams

First stage

Troféu Inconfidência

Bracket

Knockout stage

Bracket

Semi-finals

Group F

Group G

Final

Top goalscorers

References

External links
 Campeonato Mineiro Official Website

Campeonato Mineiro seasons
Mineiro
2022 in Brazilian football